Dzhebel Glacier is the 15 km long and 11 km wide glacier on Oscar II Coast, Graham Land in Antarctica situated southwest of Jorum Glacier, northeast of Chuchuliga Glacier and southeast of Goodwin Glacier.  It is draining from the slopes of Bruce Plateau and Forbidden Plateau, and flowing southeastwards to join Crane Glacier.

The feature is named after the town of Dzhebel in southern Bulgaria.

Location
British mapping in 1974.

Maps
 Antarctic Digital Database (ADD). Scale 1:250000 topographic map of Antarctica. Scientific Committee on Antarctic Research (SCAR). Since 1993, regularly upgraded and updated.

References
 Dzhebel Glacier. SCAR Composite Antarctic Gazetteer.
 Bulgarian Antarctic Gazetteer. Antarctic Place-names Commission. (details in Bulgarian, basic data in English)

External links
 Dzhebel Glacier. Copernix satellite image

Glaciers of Oscar II Coast
Bulgaria and the Antarctic